Korean flower arrangement is being revived as an indoor art, and most often uses simple Joseon dynasty whiteware to highlight Korean flowers and tree branches in elegant and unforced natural arrangements. Im Wha-Kong of Ewha Woman's University in Seoul, who also makes her own ceramic wares, is the greatest living exponent of this art, and hosts quarterly displays of flower arrangements keeping this tradition alive. There are at least a dozen schools of traditional flower arrangements.

Introduction
Formal flower arrangements were closely allied to the development of the Korean tea ceremony, and suggestions have been made that these were often corner-of-the-room arrangements on small tables using a central vessel with most often a small branch and a small group of local flowers. Sprigs of pear blossoms were particularly well known, and during the winters ever-green sprigs that would have enhanced celadon ware, or given a cool elegance to whiteware.

Leaves, blossoms, ferns, and grasses were also used.

Arrangements were primarily done by women in tea-houses and in the greater houses, Confucian male masters may have done this as well.

History
This floral art was not documented before the 14th century as a distinct art. Votive altar arrangements of flowers for Buddhist temples  were precursors. But it was under Confucian hands, in Joseon Yi dynasty times, that arrangements can be said definitely to have begun and were known, and included in illustrations by artists of that time.

Major schools of Korean flower arranging
 Catherine Muller CASA school
 Jane Packer Seoul
 Atelier FleurHeesoo (Gangnam, Seoul)- flower arrangement school of traditional french style (www.fleurheesoo.com)
 Jeju Island school
 Seoul schools
 Pusan (Busan) schools
 Mountain schools
 Palace school
 Jeonju Tea ceremony school - based in Jeonju with a frequent use of pine, and flowering blossoms of pear;
 Wha-Kong Hoe school - based in Seoul, and representing the work of Madame Wha-Kong and her natural approach to the art, with ceramics by her own hand in traditional Confucian patterns;
 Pyong-yang schools - traditional flower arrangements are an important part of northern Korean culture.

See also
Ikebana
Flower arrangement
History of flower arrangement
Korean culture
Korean art
Floristry

References 
"Oriental Flower Arrangement" in three volumes and "Oriental Flower Arrangement 100" in four volumes by Im Wha-Kong, Seoul, 1995

External links
  On the semi-annual exhibitions in Seoul of the Wha-Kong Hoe Flower Arrangement Society

Flower Arrangement
Korean Confucianism
Floristry